Myongjo is a type of typography used in Korea. Myongjo is the Sino-Korean reading of ‘Ming dynasty’ (cf. Minchō). Myongjo is used in newspaper reports and in books. There are many kinds of Myongjo, including '신명조 (ShinMyongjo)' and '견명조 (GyeonMyongjo)'. It is the Korean version of serif typefaces.

Typography